The Men's 96 kg weightlifting competitions at the 2020 Summer Olympics in Tokyo took place on 31 July at the Tokyo International Forum.

Records

Results

References

Weightlifting at the 2020 Summer Olympics
Men's events at the 2020 Summer Olympics